International Business School can refer to a number of institutions around the world, some of which are listed below:
 International Business School, Budapest
 International Business School, Germany
 Brandeis International Business School
 International Business School Groningen
 International Business School Plekhanov Russian Academy of Economics
 Isle of Man International Business School
 École de management de Normandie